Hayrick Island is a small prominent rock mass, more than  high, between Lodge Rock and Twig Rock in the Terra Firma Islands, off the west coast of Graham Land, Antarctica. The Terra Firma Islands were first visited and surveyed in 1936 by the British Graham Land Expedition under John Rymill. Hayrick Island was surveyed in 1948 by the Falkland Islands Dependencies Survey and so named by them because, when seen from the east, its high mass has an appearance suggesting a hayrick.

Granaderos Refuge 
Granaderos Refuge is an Antarctic refuge located on the Terra Firma Islands of Mikkelsen Bay
on the Fallières Coast. It is operated by the Argentine Army and was inaugurated on 17 August 1957. It depends on the San Martín Base north of the refuge  faraway.

The refuge is located on the west coast of the island and owes its name in homage to the Regiment of Mounted Grenadiers that participated in the construction of the refuge.

See also 
 List of Antarctic and sub-Antarctic islands
 List of Antarctic field camps

References

Islands of Graham Land
Fallières Coast